Thomas A. DiPrete (born 1950) is the Giddings Professor of Sociology, co-director of the Institute for Social and Economic Research and Policy at Columbia University.

Biography 
DiPrete was born in Providence, Rhode Island in 1950. He received his B.S. from the Massachusetts Institute of Technology and Ph.D. from Columbia University. Prior to joining the Columbia faculty, DiPrete served on the faculties of the University of Chicago, Duke University, and the University of Wisconsin–Madison. His research has focused on applying quantitative methods to the study of social and gender inequality in education and in the workforce.

DiPrete was named a fellow of the American Academy of Arts and Sciences in 2022. He was also named a fellow of the American Association for the Advancement of Science in 2015.

References 

Living people
Massachusetts Institute of Technology alumni
Columbia University alumni
Fellows of the American Academy of Arts and Sciences
Columbia University faculty
Academics from Rhode Island
University of Chicago faculty
Duke University faculty
University of Wisconsin–Madison faculty
1950 births